The Marriage Lines is a 1921 British silent drama film directed by Wilfred Noy and starring Barbara Hoffe, Lewis Dayton and Sam Livesey.

Cast
 Barbara Hoffe as Judith  
 Lewis Dayton as Michael Muscroft  
 Sam Livesey as Martin Muscroft  
 Charles Tilson-Chowne as Parkhill 
 Enid Sass as Sherratt  
 Arthur Walcott as Stephen

References

Bibliography
 Palmer, Scott. British Film Actors' Credits, 1895-1987. McFarland, 1998.

External links

1921 films
1921 drama films
British silent feature films
British drama films
Films directed by Wilfred Noy
British black-and-white films
1920s English-language films
1920s British films
Silent drama films